Ailama or Ahlama is a peak in the central part of the Svaneti section of the Greater Caucasus Mountain Range, located on the border between Samegrelo-Zemo Svaneti region of Georgia, and Kabardino-Balkaria, Russia at the source of the river Koruldashi. The lower slopes are covered with alpine and sub alpine meadows, while the upper slopes have glacial landscapes. There is a mountaineering camp named "Ailama" at the base of the mountain's southern slope.

References 

Mountains of Kabardino-Balkaria
Mountains of Georgia (country)
Four-thousanders of the Caucasus